Sergei Baranov (born 7 November 1983) is a Ukrainian former competitive ice dancer. With Mariana Kozlova, he is the 2003 Winter Universiade silver medalist, the 2003 Skate Israel bronze medalist, and a two-time Ukrainian national medalist. They won five medals on the ISU Junior Grand Prix series (four silver, one bronze) and qualified to compete at two ISU Junior Grand Prix Finals. They finished in the top ten at two World Junior Championships, achieving their best result, 7th, in 2003.

Baranov is an ISU Technical Specialist.

Programs 
(with Kozlova)

Results 
GP: Grand Prix; JGP: Junior Grand Prix

With Kozlova

References

External links
 

Ukrainian male ice dancers
1983 births
Sportspeople from Kharkiv
Living people
International Skating Union technical specialists
Universiade medalists in figure skating
Universiade silver medalists for Ukraine
Medalists at the 2003 Winter Universiade
Competitors at the 2001 Winter Universiade